Transgender Foundation of America (TFA) is a Houston, Texas-based non-profit organization whose mission is to advance the quality of life for transgender people. TFA engages in community development through education and outreach resources. Additionally, TFA runs a Transgender Archive and museum space called the Transgender Archives. In addition to the Transgender Archive, the TFA Transgender Center provides the transgender community with several support groups and access to therapist support, medical assistance as well as social services such as homelessness prevention, case management and HIV prevention services. July 25 was named "Transgender Center Day" in Houston by Mayor Bill White.

References

External links
 Transgender Foundation of America, organization website

Organizations based in Houston
Transgender history in the United States
Transgender organizations in the United States
LGBT culture in Houston
2001 establishments in Texas
2001 in LGBT history